The Loch nan Uamh Viaduct is a railway viaduct in Scotland that carries the West Highland Line.

History

Design
The viaduct has eight concrete arches of  span, four each side of a large central concrete pylon. The reason for this design is not known.

The viaduct crosses the Allt a' Mhama, or Mama Burn, just before it flows into Loch nan Uamh, a sea loch to the north of the Ardnish  peninsula.

Immediately to the north of the viaduct is a short tunnel.

Entombed horse
In 1987 Roland Paxton, from Heriot-Watt University, investigated the legend that a horse had fallen into a pier during construction of Glenfinnan Viaduct in 1898 or 1899. However, after inserting a fisheye camera into boreholes made into the only two piers large enough to accommodate a horse, no animal remains were found. In 1997, on the basis of local hearsay, Paxton investigated Loch nan Uamh viaduct using the same method but found only rubble as well. In 2001, he returned to Loch nan Uamh with radar equipment and found the remains of a horse and cart within the viaduct's central pylon.

References

Sources

External links

Railway bridges in Scotland
Category B listed buildings in Highland (council area)
Listed bridges in Scotland
Lochaber
Bridges completed in 1901
Bridges in Highland (council area)